Bernard F. Doucette (died 1974) was a Franco-American meteorologist, whose contributions included his observations of the 1939 Pacific typhoon season.

He became one of the scholastics at the Manila Observatory (1925-1927), returning there later (1933-1974).

References

1974 deaths
American meteorologists
Year of birth unknown
Place of birth missing